Saint-Julien-le-Vendômois (Limousin: Sent Julian (dau Vendonés)) is a commune in the Corrèze department in central France.

Population

See also
Communes of the Corrèze department

References

Communes of Corrèze